Bone disease refers to the medical conditions which affect the bone.

Terminology

A bone disease is also called an "osteopathy", but because the term osteopathy is often used to refer to an alternative health-care philosophy, use of the term can cause some confusion.

Bone and cartilage disorders

Osteochondrodysplasia is a general term for a disorder of the development of bone and cartilage.

List

A 
 Ambe
 Avascular necrosis or Osteonecrosis
 Arthritis

B 
 Bone spur (Osteophytes)

C 
 Craniosynostosis
 Coffin–Lowry syndrome
 Copenhagen disease

F 
 Fibrodysplasia ossificans progressiva
 Fibrous dysplasia
 Fong disease (or Nail–patella syndrome)
 Fracture

G 
 Giant cell tumor of bone
 Greenstick fracture
 Gout

H 
 Hypophosphatasia
 Hereditary multiple exostoses

K 
 Klippel–Feil syndrome

M 
 Metabolic bone disease
 Multiple myeloma

N 
 Nail–patella syndrome

O 
 Osteitis
 Osteitis deformans (or Paget's disease of bone)
 Osteitis fibrosa cystica (or Osteitis fibrosa, or Von Recklinghausen's disease of bone)
 Osteitis pubis
 Condensing osteitis (or Osteitis condensas)
 Osteochondritis dissecans
 Osteochondroma (bone tumor)
 Osteogenesis imperfecta
 Osteomalacia
 Osteomyelitis
 Osteopenia
 Osteopetrosis
 Osteoporosis

P 
 Porotic hyperostosis
 Primary hyperparathyroidism

R 
 Renal osteodystrophy

S 
 Salter–Harris fracture
 Scoliosis

W 
 Water on the knee

See also
 Osteoimmunology

References

External links 

 https://www.nlm.nih.gov/medlineplus/bonediseases.html

Musculoskeletal disorders